Rentschler Field  was an airport in East Hartford, Connecticut in use from 1933 to 1999. Originally a military facility, later a private corporate airport, it was decommissioned in 1999, after which the football stadium of the same name was built on the site. On Nov 22, 2021 it was announced that the undeveloped remainder of Rentschler Field, was acquired from Raytheon Technologies (formerly United Technologies, Pratt and Whitney) by Massachusetts development firm National Development. The property will offer businesses more than 280 acres for development. Terms of the deal were not disclosed. From 1930 to 1939, the Chance Vought Aircraft Corporations's manufacturing facility was located here, as was the Pratt & Whitney Aircraft Company and the Hamilton Standard Propellers Corporation.

History 
During World War II the airfield was used by the United States Army Air Forces First Air Force as a fighter base, providing coastal air defense over the Atlantic Ocean. After the war, the airfield was returned to civilian use.

Rentschler Field was decommissioned as an airport and donated to the state of Connecticut by United Technologies in 1999. Part of the former airport became the University of Connecticut's new football stadium, Rentschler Field.

See also 
 Connecticut World War II Army Airfields

References 

 Thole, Lou (1999), Forgotten Fields of America : World War II Bases and Training, Then and Now - Vol. 2. Publisher: Pictorial Histories Pub,

External links
https://web.archive.org/web/20100113104552/http://airfields-freeman.com/CT/Airfields_CT_C.html#Rentschler
https://www.courant.com/business/hc-biz-pratt-whitney-site-sale-20211122-pf3rx6sr35hsppmbraspo4q4dy-story.html

Defunct airports in Connecticut
Airfields of the United States Army Air Forces in Connecticut
Airports in Hartford County, Connecticut
1933 establishments in Connecticut
1999 disestablishments in Connecticut